The DeLand Hall is a historic site in DeLand, Florida, United States. It is located within the Stetson University Campus Historic District, on the northeast corner of an entrance to the university at from North Woodland Boulevard across from West Minnesota Avenue. On January 27, 1983, it was added to the U.S. National Register of Historic Places.

References

External links
 Volusia County listings at National Register of Historic Places
 Florida's Office of Cultural and Historical Programs
 Volusia County listings
 DeLand Hall
 Great Floridians of DeLand
 DeLand Historical Trail at Historic Hiking Trails

National Register of Historic Places in Volusia County, Florida
DeLand, Florida